Ethyl pentanoate, also commonly known as ethyl valerate, is an organic compound used in flavors.  It is an ester with the molecular formula C7H14O2.  This colorless liquid is poorly soluble in water but miscible with organic solvents.

As is the case with most volatile esters, it has a pleasant aroma and taste.  It is used as a food additive to impart a fruity flavor, particularly of apple.

References

Ethyl esters
Food additives
Flavors
Valerate esters